Berbers in Mali are Malian citizens of Berber descent or persons of Berber descent residing in Mali. Ethnic Berbers in Mali are believed to number of 850,000.

References 

 
Ethnic groups in Mali